Karel Nováček was the defending champion, but the seventh seeded Czech lost in the quarterfinals to Gilbert Schaller. Qualifier Marcelo Ríos won in the final 6–4, 7–5, 6–4 against Jan Siemerink and captured his second title of the year.

Seeds
Champion seeds are indicated in bold while text in italics indicates the round in which that seed was eliminated.

Draw

Finals

Section 1

Section 2

External links
 ATP main draw

Singles